Thierno Issiaga Barry Arévalo (born 12 January 2000), sometimes known as just Thierno, is a footballer who plays mainly as a left winger for SD Logroñés, on loan from CD Tenerife. Born in Spain, he plays for the Guinea national team.

Club career
Born in Santa Cruz de Tenerife, Canary Islands to a Guinean father and a Spanish mother, Thierno was a CD Tenerife youth graduate, and made his senior debut with the C-team in the 2018–19 season, in the regional leagues. Ahead of the 2019–20 campaign, he was promoted to the reserves in Tercera División.

On 23 April 2021, Thierno signed a new three-year contract with Tete. He made his first team debut on 4 September, coming on as a late substitute for Álex Corredera in a 2–0 Segunda División home win over SD Ponferradina.

On 1 September 2022, Thierno was loaned to Primera Federación side SD Logroñés for the season.

International career
On 19 March 2022, Thierno was called up to the Guinea national team by manager Kaba Diawara for friendlies against South Africa and Zambia. He made his full international debut six days later, starting in a 0–0 draw with the former at the Guldensporen Stadion in Kortrijk, Belgium.

References

External links

2000 births
Living people
Footballers from Santa Cruz de Tenerife
Guinean footballers
Guinea international footballers
Spanish footballers
Guinean people of Spanish descent
Spanish people of Guinean descent
Citizens of Guinea through descent
Association football wingers
CD Tenerife B players
CD Tenerife players
SD Logroñés players
Divisiones Regionales de Fútbol players
Segunda División players
Primera Federación players
Tercera División players
Spanish sportspeople of African descent